Razak Mohammed Bengali (born 20 November 1988 in Abidjan) is an Ivorian footballer who currently plays for R.S.C. Anderlecht.

Career
Bengali began his career by R.S.C. Anderlecht and was loaned out to R. Union Saint-Gilloise in 2008. He made his debut in professional football, being part of the R. Union Saint-Gilloise squad in the 2007–08 season.

References

External links
Footgoal Profile
Foto at RSCA.be

1988 births
Living people
Ivorian footballers
R.S.C. Anderlecht players
Belgian Pro League players
Expatriate footballers in Belgium
Association football forwards
Footballers from Abidjan
Ivorian expatriates in Belgium